"Oye" (English: Listen! or Hey!) is a song by Cuban American singer and songwriter Gloria Estefan. It was released by Epic on July 13, 1998 as the second single from her eighth studio album, gloria! (1998). The song was written by Estefan, her husband Emilio Estefan, Jr., Randall Barlow and Angie Chirino and produced by Estefan, Jr., Barlow and Tony Moran. It was planned for commercial release in the US on July 14, 1998 in various formats, but at the last minute the release was cancelled. However, the single still reached number one on the US Billboard Hot Dance Music/Club Play chart and in Spain. It earned the Billboard Latin Music Award in the category for "Best Latin Club-Dance Track of the Year".

On June 3, 2022, Estefan released the "Oye" English (EP) and its Spanish (EP) to all digital and streaming outlets.

Critical reception
J.D. Considine from The Baltimore Sun felt that "Oye" is "where latin meets disco most effectively." He added, "Basically a sort of techno-salsa fusion, it combines the thumping regularity of electronics with the soulful release of Afro-Cuban rhythm, a combination so potent it makes dancing an almost involuntary response." Also Ben Wener from Beaver County Times noted the "bouncing Afro-Cuban flourishes" of the song. 

Larry Flick from Billboard remarked that the second single from "La Glo's slammin' dance opus", gloria!, "sidesteps the disco demeanor of the previous "Heaven's What I Feel" in favor of a percussive salsa flavor." He added, "Once again, the veteran singer manages to surprise and delight, delivering a bilingual performance that is fraught with smoldering sensuality. She is bolstered by an arrangement that teeters between current club sounds and the shoulder-shakin' tone of her Miami Sound Machine breakthrough, "Conga". In fact, if you've been pining away for a jam that captures the party vibe of that classic recording, look no further." 

Joey Guerra from Houston Chronicle stated that it has one of the album's "strongest punches", describing it as a "sweltering bilingual cut that recalls" Puerto Rican singer Ricky Martin's international smash "Maria". Victoria Segal from NME said that songs like "Oye" "speak the international language of tedium". Flick for Vibe noted that the song has a "ferocious new energy and a vocal spark that Estefan hasn't previously displayed."

Music video
The accompanying music video for "Oye" was directed by Argentinian director Gustavo Garzón and features Estefan performing the song in a nightclub.

Charts

Formats and track listings

Official versions and remixes
Original versions
 Album Version – (4:40)
 Extra-Large Album Version – (5:05)
 Tony Moran Radio Edit #1 – (3:52)
 Tony Moran Radio Edit #2 – (4:17)

Remixes

 Pablo Flores English Remix Radio Edit (aka Pablo Flores Remix) – (4:17)
 Pablo Flores Spanish Remix Radio Edit (aka Pablo Flores Spanish Remix) – (4:17)
 Pablo Flores 12" Mix – (8:24)
 Pablo Flores Dub Mix – (5:10)
 Rosabel's Cubarican Club Mix – (9:55)
 Rosabel's Cubarican Club Edit – (7:35)
 Rosabel's Cubarican English Radio Edit (aka Rosabel's Cubarican Radio Edit #1) – (3:51)
 Rosabel's Cubarican Spanish Radio Edit (aka Rosabel's Cubarican Radio Edit #2) – (3:51)
 Rosabel's Data-Flash Dub – (8:13)
 Rosabel's Havana Dub – (8:05)
 Mijangos Latin Mix w/ English Vocals – (9:41)
 Mijangos Latin Mix w/ Spanish Vocals – (9:41)
 Mijangos Latin Radio Edit – (4:00)
 Mijangos English Radio Edit – (4:00)
 Mijangos House Dub – (8:09)
 Mijangos Club Mix w/ English Vocals – (8:25)
 Mijangos Club Mix w/ Spanish Vocals – (8:25)
 Hex Hector 12" Mix – (7:50)
 Hex Hector Radio Mix – (4:00)
 Hex Hector Dub – (7:30)
 Hex Hector Bonus Beats – (4:00)
 DJ Greek's Dark Club Mix – (6:24)
 DJ Greek's Caliente Mix – (5:10)
 Clamaran & Pautrat's Club Mix – (7:28)
 Clamaran & Pautrat's Radio Edit – (3:46)
 Clamaran & Pautrat's Ultra Dub + Voices – (7:15)
 Clamaran & Pautrat's Ultra Dub – (6:42)

Release history

See also
List of number-one Billboard Hot Latin Tracks of 1998
List of number-one Billboard Hot Tropical Songs from the 1990s
Number-one dance hits of 1998 (USA)

External links
Lyrics with English translation
Gloria Estefan Discography Database

References

1998 singles
Gloria Estefan songs
Number-one singles in Spain
Macaronic songs
Dance-pop songs
Epic Records singles
1998 songs
Songs written by Gloria Estefan
Songs written by Emilio Estefan
House music songs
Songs about dancing